Swandown is a 2012 film directed by Andrew Kötting.

To make the film, Andrew Kötting and Iain Sinclair pedaled a swan pedalo from the seaside in Hastings to Hackney in East London, occasionally joined by guests including Alan Moore, Stewart Lee, Dudley Sutton, Dr Mark Lythgoe and Marcia Farquhar.

External links

References

2012 films
British documentary films
2010s English-language films
2010s British films